The 1904 European Rowing Championships were rowing championships held in Courbevoie, a suburb of Paris, on the Seine on a day in the middle of August. The competition was for men only and they competed in five boat classes (M1x, M2x, M2+, M4+, M8+). The 1904 Summer Olympics had been held in St. Louis, United States, just two weeks prior but no European rowers had attended (apart from auxiliary events that are not considered Olympic events).

Medal summary

Footnotes

References

European Rowing Championships
European Rowing Championships
Rowing
Rowing
European Rowing Championships
Sports competitions in Paris
European